Brian Gregory Gosch (born May 26, 1971) is an American politician and attorney from the state of South Dakota. He was a member of the South Dakota House of Representatives, and served as the Speaker of the House from 2013 to 2015. In November 2014, he was elected as Majority Leader of the South Dakota House of Representatives beginning in the 2015 session. He was replaced as Speaker of the House by Dean Wink.

Early life, education, and career
Gosch was born in Aberdeen, South Dakota. He attended high school at Martin Luther Prep School in Prairie du Chien, Wisconsin. He graduated from the University of South Dakota in 1993 and then attended the University of South Dakota School of Law, graduating in 1996.

Career 
He became an attorney for South Dakota Advocacy Services for people with disabilities in Rapid City, South Dakota. He was appointed to the South Dakota House by Governor Mike Rounds in 2007, succeeding Alan Hanks, who resigned his seat after winning the mayoralty of Rapid City. In 2013, Gosch was elected Speaker of the House of Representatives for the 87th Legislative Assembly, a post he held until 2015. The previous year, Gosch proposed classifying texting while driving as a statewide secondary offense.

As of 2021, Gosch serves as a governmental affairs representative for the National Rifle Association.

Personal life 
Gosch and his wife, Heather, have six children.

References

External links

 

1971 births
Living people
Politicians from Aberdeen, South Dakota
Republican Party members of the South Dakota House of Representatives
Speakers of the South Dakota House of Representatives
University of South Dakota alumni
University of South Dakota School of Law alumni
21st-century American politicians